Gurinder Singh (born 1 January 1995) is an Indian field hockey player who plays as a defender. He was part of the Indian squad that won the 2016 Men's Hockey Junior World Cup. He made his senior team debut at the 2017 Sultan Azlan Shah Cup.

References

External links
Gurinder Singh at Hockey India

1995 births
Living people
People from Rupnagar
Indian male field hockey players
Field hockey players from Punjab, India
Male field hockey defenders
Field hockey players at the 2018 Commonwealth Games
Commonwealth Games competitors for India